Country Code: 246

International Call Prefix: 00

National Significant Numbers (NSN): seven digits

The group of islands forming the British Indian Ocean Territory does not use area codes.

This region includes the Chagos Archipelago, the main island of which is Diego Garcia.

Allocations

See also
Telephone numbers in the United Kingdom

References

Communications in the British Indian Ocean Territory
British Indian Ocean Territory
British Indian Ocean Territory